Saheb Bibi Golam is a 1953 Bengali novel written by Bimal Mitra (1912–1991) and is set in Calcutta, India during the last years of the nineteenth century. It was serialised in the magazine Desh in November 1952.

The novels tells the story of the sumptuous lifestyle and the decay of a feudal family. It is the story of Pateshwari aka Chhoto Bou, a woman who wants to experience romance, to be a real wife, to invent for herself and live a new kind of conjugality. But the book also tells the story of Calcutta, now Kolkata, and of all the people who lived there.

Adaptations

The novel was adapted into Bengali film, Saheb Bibi Golam (King, Queen, Knave) in 1956, starring Sumitra Devi, Uttam Kumar and Chhabi Biswas. A Hindi version, Sahib Bibi Aur Ghulam released in 1962 starring Meena Kumari, Rehman, Guru Dutt and Waheeda Rehman among others, went on to become a huge hit.

Title
The title Sahib Bibi Aur Ghulam is translated in English as King, Queen and Knave. The literal meaning comes from playing cards.

References 

Indian novels adapted into films
Indian feudalism
20th-century Indian novels
Novels set in Kolkata
Indian Bengali-language novels